Josephine Ejiroghene Oniyama (born 1983 in Manchester) is an English singer-songwriter. She has released three albums and a number of singles.

Early life
Living in the Manchester suburb of Hulme, Oniyama grew up in a colourful West African culture combined with the large musical heritage of Manchester, which shaped her style.  She was playing gigs by the age of 15. During her college years she was further influenced by Sister Rosetta Tharpe, Bob Dylan, Joni Mitchell, and Bob Marley. She has Jamaican and Nigerian roots that are reflected in her songs, which cover genres from gospel and country to soul music.

Career
In 2002 Oniyama released her debut album A SMALLER VERSION OF THE REAL THING via Storm music Ltd.Steve Long/Dewsbury. a champion of Oniyama's music sent out copies to Radio stations throughout the UK on the premise she was the 21st century Odetta, 10 years later in 2012 Oniyama released her 2nd album Portrait which was produced by Leo Abrahams. The album also features co-writes with Jimmy Hogarth and Ed Harcourt. The album was preceded by singles "What a Day" and "Original Love" (A-listed on BBC Radio 2). The album received positive reviews from The Guardian, The Times, The Mirror, Q and Mojo.  The single "Portrait" was played on Radio 2 and was released at about the same time as the album.

Oniyama appeared on 'Later with Jools Holland' and the Andrew Marr Show  and more recently performed live from Glastonbury on BBC2.

In 2012 Oniyama backed up Paolo Nutini, Michael Kiwanuka, Rodrigo y Gabriella  and The Noisettes in live concerts. She toured with Paloma Faith across her UK tour in early 2013 as well as undertaking her own headline tour in April 2013. Her festival appearances in 2013 include Glastonbury, T in the Park, Latitude and Electric Picnic.

The album Portrait was released in Germany, Austria and Switzerland on 5 July 2013.

In 2015 she contributed by singing on four songs on the jazz album Into Forever by Matthew Halsall & The Gondwana Orchestra.

In 2016, Oniyama appeared on Scottish band Travis' eighth album, Everything at Once. She is featured on the track "Idlewild".

In November 2022, she released her third album, Kindred.

Releases
 "Bus of Life" (Single) Ugly Man Records 2001
 "Come Around" (Single) Ugly Man Records 2001 
 A Smaller Version of the Real Thing (Album) Storm Records 2002
 "In The Labyrinth" (Single EP) Island Records 2008
 "Last Minute" (single), Ark Recordings / Rubyworks, 2013
 Portrait (album), Ark Recordings / Rubyworks, 2012
 "Portrait" (single), Ark Recordings / Rubyworks, 2012
 "Original Love" (Single), Ark Recordings / Rubyworks, 2012
 "What a Day" (single), Ark Recordings / Rubyworks, 2012
 "'Til You" (single), Ark Recordings / Rubyworks, 2017
 Kindred (album), Sound of Solar Records, 2022

References

External links
 Josephine Oniyama on Woman's Hour, 26 September 2002.
 "World On Your Street", BBC Radio 3.

1983 births
Living people
People from Hulme
21st-century English women singers
21st-century English singers
Musicians from Manchester